A Date with Elvis is the third full-length studio album by the American rock band the Cramps, released in the UK on Big Beat Records in 1986. The title was appropriated from A Date with Elvis (1959), the eighth album by Elvis Presley. The album was recorded in fall 1985 and engineered by Steve McMillan and Mark Ettel at Ocean Way Studios in Hollywood, California. The album was first released in the US in 1990 by Enigma Records, with the bonus tracks "Blue Moon Baby," "Georgia Lee Brown," "Give Me a Woman," and "Get Off the Road." The Cramps reissued the album (with bonus tracks) on their own Vengeance Records in 2001. The original album was reissued in the UK by Big Beat in 2013 on orange vinyl, and subsequently reissued again by Vengeance Records in the US, UK and Canada in 2014. It was The Cramps’ most commercially successful album release, reaching the US Billboard Top 100 and UK Top 40.

The album was dedicated to Ricky Nelson, whose version of the song "Lonesome Town" (covered by the Cramps on their first EP Gravest Hits and later included on compilation album ...Off the Bone) was a US hit single in 1958. It is also significant in that it is the only Cramps album to feature vocals by guitarist Poison Ivy, on "Kizmiaz" (as well as on the B-side "Get Off the Road" included on the 1990 reissue).

Critical reception
Robert Palmer, in The New York Times, praised the album and called it the band's best.  He wrote: "After a decade together, the Cramps have learned to focus and intensify their inventive revisions of rock-and-roll tradition and their playfully anarchic spirit." The A to X of Alternative Music called it the band's "most effective distillation of psychedelia, punk and rock'n'roll."

Track listing

Charts

Personnel

The Cramps
 Lux Interior – vocals
 Poison Ivy Rorschach – guitars, bass, vocals on "Kizmiaz" and "Get Off the Road"
 Nick Knox – drums, bongos
with:
 McMartin Preschool Choir (includes Fur Dixon) – vocals on "People Ain't No Good"

Technical
 Mark Ettel, Steve Macmillan – engineer
 Joe Schiff, Tony Chiappa – assistant engineers
 Eddy Schreyer – mastering
 The Cramps – cover layout, photography
 Phil Smee – cover illustration (lettering)

References

1986 albums
The Cramps albums